Michael Achagwe Luguje is a Ghanaian public servant and the Director General of Ghana Ports and Harbours Authority.

Early life and education 
Luguje was born on 28 November 1973 at Pong in Tamale but hails from Navrongo, in the Upper East Region of Ghana. He holds a Bachelor of Arts degree in French and Linguistics from the University of Ghana, and Master of Science degree in Maritime Affairs from the World Maritime University in Malmo, Sweden. He also holds an Executive Master of Business Administration in Project and Strategic Management from the Paris Graduate School of Management, France.

Career 
Luguje joined the Ghana Ports and Harbours Authority in 1998 as a National Service Personnel. He gained employment at the organisation in 1999, and five years later, he became the special assistant to the then Director General of the Ghana Ports and Harbours Authority. He joined the International Maritime Organisation (IMO) in 2007, working as the Regional Coordinator for Western and Central Africa, and in 2012, he was made the Secretary General for Port Management Association of West and Central Africa (PMAWCA). While working with PMAWCA, he doubled as the Executive Secretary of the Pan African Association of Port Cooperation (PAPC). He served in that capacity from 2012 until 2017. In June 2018 he was appointed Acting Director General of the Ghana Ports and Harbours Authority, and a month later, he was made substantive Director General of the organisation. He succeeded Paul Ansah.

Personal life 
Luguje is fluent in the English and French languages.

See also
List of Akufo-Addo government ministers and political appointees
Ghana Ports and Harbours Authority

References 

Living people
1973 births
University of Ghana alumni